ABC is an imperative general-purpose programming language and integrated development environment (IDE) developed at Centrum Wiskunde & Informatica (CWI), Netherlands by Leo Geurts, Lambert Meertens, and Steven Pemberton. It is interactive, structured, high-level, and intended to be used instead of BASIC, Pascal, or AWK. It is intended for teaching or prototyping, but not as a systems-programming language.

ABC had a major influence on the design of the language Python, developed by Guido van Rossum, who formerly worked for several years on the ABC system in the mid-1980s.

Features
Its designers claim that ABC programs are typically around a quarter the size of the equivalent Pascal or C programs, and more readable. Key features include:

Only five basic data types
No required variable declarations
Explicit support for top-down programming
Statement nesting is indicated by indentation, via the off-side rule
Infinite precision arithmetic, unlimited-sized lists and strings, and other features supporting orthogonality and ease of use by novices

ABC was originally a monolithic implementation, leading to an inability to adapt to new requirements, such as creating a graphical user interface (GUI). ABC could not directly access the underlying file system and operating system.

The full ABC system includes a programming environment with a structure editor (syntax-directed editor), suggestions, static variables (persistent), and multiple workspaces, and is available as an interpreter–compiler. , the latest version is 1.05.02, and it is ported to Unix, DOS, Atari, and Apple MacOS.

Example
An example function to collect the set of all words in a document:

 HOW TO RETURN words document:
    PUT {} IN collection
    FOR line IN document:
       FOR word IN split line:
          IF word not.in collection:
             INSERT word IN collection
    RETURN collection

References

External links
ABC Programmer's Handbook

Computer science in the Netherlands
Dutch inventions
Educational programming languages
Information technology in the Netherlands
Persistent programming languages
Procedural programming languages
Programming languages created in the 1980s